Verneuil-l'Étang is a railway station in Verneuil-l'Étang, Île-de-France, France. The station is on the Paris–Mulhouse railway line. The station is served by TER (local) services operated by SNCF: Transilien line P (Paris–Longueville–Provins).

From 1892 until 1950 the station was terminus of the Vincennes railway line, from Paris-Bastille. The station was also the start of the line to Marles-en-Brie via Chaumes-en-Brie and Fontenay-Trésigny, from 1893 until 1913 when the lines were closed because there was not enough use of the services. There also used to be a tram to Melun, which finished here.

Gallery

External links

 
Transilien network map
Transilien website

Railway stations in Seine-et-Marne
Railway stations in France opened in 1857